Lusitania was an ancient Iberian Roman province located where modern Portugal (south of the Douro river) and part of western Spain (the present autonomous community of Extremadura and a part of the province of Salamanca) lie. As with the Roman names of many European countries, Lusitania was and is often used as an alternative name for Portugal.

Terms
Lusophone
Lusophobia
Lusitanic
Lusitanian distribution
Lusitanian flora

Political movements
Integralismo Lusitano

Outer space
HD 45652 (Lusitânia)

Territories
New Lusitania
Kingdom of Northern Lusitania

Geology
Lusitanian Basin

Ships
RMS Lusitania
SS Lusitania
Lusitania (1805 ship)
SS Lusitania (1871)

Sports
Lusitano G.C.
Lusitano F.C. (Portugal)
Lusitano F.C. (South Africa)
Lusitano FCV
Lusitanos XV
S.C. Lusitânia
S.C. Lusitânia (basketball)
Lusitânia F.C.
FC Lusitanos
Luzitano Futebol Clube
Gremio Lusitano
US Lusitanos Saint-Maur
US Créteil-Lusitanos
Lusitano Stadium
Tuna Luso Brasileira

Literature
Os Lusíadas
Lusitania Sacra
Luso-Brazilian Review

Churches
Lusitanian Catholic Orthodox Church
Lusitanian Catholic Apostolic Evangelical Church

Military
Loyal Lusitanian Legion

News agencies
Lusa News Agency

Animal breeds
Lusitano

Genera
Lusotitan
Lusovenator
Lusitanosaurus
Lusitanops
Lusitania (alga)

Species

Animals
Lusitanian cownose ray
Lusitanian toadfish
Lusitanian pine vole
Carabus lusitanicus
Arion lusitanicus
Ommatissopyrops lusitanicus
Lusitanops lusitanicus
Dagetichthys lusitanicus
Centrophorus lusitanicus
Iberochondrostoma lusitanicum
Brachyderes lusitanicus
Adustomyces lusitanicus
Odontosiro lusitanicus
Monotropus lusitanicus
Messor lusitanicus
Oxybelus lusitanicus
Nesticus lusitanicus
Sphingonotus (Sphingonotus) lusitanicus
Thorectes lusitanicus
Ammoecius lusitanicus
Amphimallon lusitanicum
Exosoma lusitanicum
Dorcadion lusitanicum
Eosentomon lusitanicum
Zodarion lusitanicum
Sepidium lusitanicum
Epaspidoceras lusitanicum
Tomistoma lusitanicum
Hydrolagus lusitanicus
Homalenotus lusitanicus
Platyderus lusitanicus
Proasellus lusitanicus
Polydesmus lusitanicus
Trogulus lusitanicus

Plants
Lusitanian oak
Narcissus lusitanicus
Asphodelus lusitanicus
Cupressus lusitanica
Kajanthus lusitanicus
Allium lusitanicum
Fritillaria lusitanica
Drosophyllum lusitanicum
Ophioglossum lusitanicum
Echium lusitanicum
Erica lusitanica
Teucrium lusitanicum
Hieracium lusitanicum
Alexandrium lusitanicum
Echinospartum lusitanicum
Oedogonium lusitanicum
Pinguicula lusitanica

Fungi
Mucor lusitanicus
Chlorophyllum lusitanicum

Firearms
Lusa submachine gun

Music
Alma Lusa

Companies
LusoVU

References

Lusitania